Jumellea exilis is a species of flowering plant in the family Orchidaceae, endemic to the island of Réunion.

References

Jumellea
Orchids of Réunion
Endemic flora of Réunion